Godwin Johnson (born 16 February 2003) is an Indian professional footballer who plays as a midfielder for Indian Arrows in the I-League.

Career
Godwin Johnson made his first professional appearance for Indian Arrows on 10 January 2021 against Churchill Brothers as Substitute on 90th min.

Career statistics

References

2003 births
Living people
Indian footballers
Indian Arrows players
I-League players
Association football midfielders
Footballers from Karnataka